Prionapteryx cuneolalis is a moth in the family Crambidae. It was described by George Duryea Hulst in 1886. It is found in North America, where it has been recorded from Texas.

References

Ancylolomiini
Moths described in 1886
Taxa named by George Duryea Hulst